Beland or Béland may refer to:

People
 Beland Honderich, Canadian newspaper executive
 Daniel Beland, Canadian figure skater
 David Beland, Canadian athlete
 Henri Sévérin Béland, Canadian parliamentarian
 Jean-Louis Béland, Canadian politician
 Joseph Béland, Canadian politician
 Jules Béland, Canadian cyclist
 Louis Béland-Goyette, Canadian soccer player
 Nicole Beland, American journalist
 Richard Beland, American Hockey Player

Other
 Città Beland, title held by the city of Żejtun, Malta
 R. v. Béland, a Supreme Court of Canada decision